Sutton Bridge Power Station is an 819 MW gas-fired power station in Sutton Bridge in the south-east of Lincolnshire in South Holland, England. It is situated on Centenary Way close to the River Nene. It is a major landmark on the Lincolnshire and Norfolk border and on clear days with its bright red lights it can be easily seen as far away as Hunstanton.

History
It was built by Enron at a cost of £337 million in May 1999 trading under the name of Sutton Bridge Power. It was constructed by Enron Engineering & Construction and designed by Stone & Webster with help from Atlantic Projects in building the steam turbine. In September 1999, it put the plant up for sale as the cost of electricity had plummeted, being uneconomic to generate. Enron already had another large CCGT power station on Teesside (which is the largest in Europe). 

In March 2000, the plant was bought by London Electricity, a division of EDF Energy for £156 million. The plant employs thirty five people and is run by General Electric International. The power plant supplies 2% of the electricity for England and Wales.

Since September 2001, it has had a visitor centre for school children. When driving nearby to the north on the A17, the landmark is a dividing point between Lincolnshire and Norfolk.

EDF Energy announced in 2008 that it would sell Sutton Bridge to overcome objections to its takeover of British Energy. Macquarie Group purchased the site and it is operated on their behalf by General Electric.

Macquarie later spunout the power plant owning part of the business as Calon Energy in 2015.

In August 2020, it was reported that the plant is to be mothballed following Calon Energy entering administration.

Specifications
The power station is a CCGT type, with two General Electric Frame 9 (9FA+) gas turbines powered with natural gas. 

The exhaust gas heats a heat recovery steam generator, made by the Dutch company Standard Fasel Lentjes which was bought by NEM, which powers a GE 280 MW steam turbine. The electrical generators were also built by GE, which connect to the National Grid at 400 kV.

References

External links

 EDF Energy page
 CCGTs in northern England

Natural gas-fired power stations in England
Power stations in Lincolnshire
Power stations in the East Midlands